Bisankhunarayan is a village and former Village Development Committee that is now part of Godawari Municipality in Province No. 3 of central Nepal. At the time of the 1991 Nepal census it had a population of 3,867 in 707 individual households. Bishankhunarayan is a historic place because of Vishnu's temple called Bishankhu narayan, a popular Hindu god. Narayan is another name for Lord Vishnu. 
A small cave is located inside the temple periphery. And amazing things is that the main idol of Narayan is situated inside that small cave and even the priest also stays turned inside it for worshipping.

Bishankhu Narayan temple is one of the Narayan's temple of the four Narayan temple inside the Kathmandu valley. Ancient people's beliefs that, upon successful visit of four Narayan's temple within the same day might brought lots of happiness, joy and prosperity in life. 

Every year tens of thousand pilgrims visit these four temple.

Villages near Bishnankhunarayan include Godawari, Lamatar, Godamchour. Bishankhunarayn vdc has rich water resources as well as big and thick forest.

References

External links
UN map of the municipalities of Lalitpur District

Populated places in Lalitpur District, Nepal